St. George's University School of Medicine is the medical school of St. George's University located in St. George's, Grenada. The school was founded by Charles R. Modica on July 23, 1976. Because of its size, the school placed more doctors into first-year US residency positions than any other medical school in the world between 2011 and 2012. It was rated by The Princeton Review as one of the "Best 168 Medical Schools" in 2012.

Mission 
The stated mission of St. George's University Doctor of Medicine degree program is to "provide an international, culturally diverse environment in which students learn the knowledge, skills and attitudes required for postgraduate training in the health profession, while being inspired to develop compassion, curiosity, tolerance and  commitment to patients and society, dedication to life-long learning and an understanding of the vital role of research in healthcare."

Admissions 
The average undergraduate G.P.A. of accepted students is 3.4 and the average MCAT score is 26, compared with 3.69 and 31 respectively in the United States. The medical students at St. George's come from many universities in the United States and around the world.

The New York Times refers to St. George's as a "second chance" medical school, because many of the students attend after they are unable to gain acceptance to a US medical school. Only 65% of students that enrolled in 2009 graduated within 4 years, although another 20% graduated after 5 years.

Academics 
While traditional US-based medical schools do not pay hospitals to accept their students for clinical rotations, St. George's has signed a contract to pay more than $100 million to hospitals to accept their students.

Because of its large student body, SGU is the top provider of doctors into first-year US residencies for the last eight years with more than 935 placements in 2018. SGU is the international school with the greatest amount of licensed physicians in the United States per the 2108 FSMB Survey with 10,791 licensed physicians. While two-thirds of its students are US citizens, its student body and faculty represent over 140 countries, and its graduates practice in more than 50 countries worldwide. As part of its focus on a global curriculum, students in the Keith B. Taylor Scholars Program pathway, or the traditional pathway can take medical electives in Prague, Thailand, India, Honduras, Kenya and Sweden, as well as health practica throughout parts of Africa, Asia, Europe, and the Americas, while also completing years three and four of medical school in the United States, the UK or Canada.

As of 2015, tuition at St. George's medical school cost more than $250,000.

Notable alumni
 Suzanne Mallouk - Canadian-born painter, psychiatrist, best known for her relationship with artist Jean-Michel Basquiat
 Rosalind Ambrose - founding member of the Caribbean Society of Radiologists
 Robert Lewis Morgan - politician who served in the New Jersey General Assembly for one term from 2004 to 2006

References

Medical schools in Grenada
1970s establishments in Grenada
Buildings and structures in St. George's, Grenada